Victoria was a federal electoral district in New Brunswick, Canada, that was represented in the House of Commons of Canada from 1867 to 1917.

It was created by the British North America Act of 1867, and was re-distributed in 1914 into Restigouche—Madawaska and Victoria—Carleton ridings.

The riding's boundaries were the same as those of Victoria County, New Brunswick, and were not adjusted during the period that the riding existed.

Members of Parliament

This riding elected the following Members of Parliament:

Electoral history

See also 

 List of Canadian federal electoral districts
 Past Canadian electoral districts

External links 
 Riding history from the Library of Parliament

Former federal electoral districts of New Brunswick